MTV Lithuania & Latvia was a twenty-four-hour music and entertainment channel operated by MTV Networks Europe. The channel was originally formed in September 2006 at Lithuania, at January 2009 it got re-formed to double channel including both Lithuania and Latvia and targeted audiences in Lithuania and Latvia.

History
In 2006, MTV Networks Europe established MTV Networks Baltic a new broadcasting service which provided localized channels for Latvia, Lithuania and Estonia. MTV Networks Baltic launched three separate channels within the region in September, 2006. Initially, MTV Networks Baltic comprised MTV Latvia, MTV Lithuania and MTV Estonia. But due to financial difficulties with the region heightened by the global economic downturn, MTV Networks International merged MTV Latvia and MTV Lithuania to form MTV Lithuania and Latvia in January 2009.

MTV Estonia remained as stand alone channel.

The first video to air on MTV in the Baltic region was Justice vs. Simian – "We Are Your Friends".
In 2008, MTV Networks International signed a new licensing agreement with Israeli Communications company Ananey Communications to continue to operate and manage the MTV brand within the Baltic Region.
The channel ceased broadcasting on November 18, 2009.
As of November 18, 2009 MTV Europe has replaced MTV Baltic channels.
Lithuania receives MTV Europe and other Viacom international channels, distributed by "Starworks LT".

Channel
The channel combined local and international music, as well as MTV's trademark shows such as Pimp My Ride, Celebrity Deathmatch and Wildboyz which were shown with subtitles in Lithuanian. The network also aired local programmes as European Top 20, Baltic Top 20, Dance Floor Chart, MTV Oops and MTV Supermercado. Prior to closing, it had launched a reality show live from the MTV Lietuva headquarters, the humour show Baltish and Pimp My Ride Baltic were created by MTV Lietuva. Lithuanian MTV VJs are VJ Ugnė, VJ Jonas and twins VJ Artūras and VJ Robertas.

Local shows
 MTV News
 Baltic Top 20
 Dance Floor Chart
 MTV's Most Wanted
 Sandra
 Wishlist
 Show Wishlist
 Top 10 @ 10
 Making the Video
 MTV Special
 This Is The New S***
 Baltic Top 100 (seasonal)
 World Chart Express
 UK Top 10
 Rock Chart
 Hitlist Base Chart

Former local shows
 Baltish
 Ežio stažas
 MTV Oops
 Pimp My Ride Baltic
 MTV Supermercado
 MTV Rainbow
 Celebrities chart
 MTV B-Day
 MTV News. 7 days
 Music Download Chart Top 10

Pan-European shows
 Euro Top 20
 MTV Push
 MTV World Stage
 MTV at the Movies
 MTV Live Sessions
 MTV EMA (seasonal)
 EMA Spotlight (seasonal)

Shows imported from MTV Networks US
 The Real World
 True Life
 Made
 MTV Cribs
 MTV Essentials
 Brooke Knows Best
 MTV's Busted
 My Super Sweet 16
 The City
 Boiling Points
 A Double Shot at Love
 Wildboyz
 Dirty Sanchez
 Dismissed
 Beavis & Butthead
 Room Raiders
 Parental Control
 Run's House
 Viva La Bam
 MTV Movie Awards (seasonal)
 MTV VMA (seasonal)

Other shows
 Chillout Zone
 MTV Beat
 MTV Amour
 MTV Roulette
 MTV's Breakfast Club
 MTV Flasher
 MTV Fuzz
 Smells like 90s
 Alternative Nation
 MTV New Rave
 SpongeBob SquarePants

Other former shows
 Rise and Shine
 Don't Stop The Music
 Popular Music
 Superock
 The Block
 Patyzone
 Superpop

Other projects
 Coca-Cola Soundwave (seasonal)
 Pradėk nuo savęs
 No Smoking Power
 MTV Exit
 MTV Fanwalk
 Ežio inkubatorius

Change in format
MTV Networks Europe originally launched separate MTV channels in Lithuania (MTV Lietuva) and Latvia (MTV Latvija) in September 2006. Both channels offered a mixture of local and international content. Due to the global recession and its impact on Latvia, MTV Networks Baltic merged both channels to form MTV Lietuva & Latvija, and this channel was supposed to operate until the economic crisis is rectified. But unfortunately MTV Lietuva & Latvija and MTV Estonia ceased operations on November 19, 2009 and have been replaced by the original MTV Europe channel.

VJs
 Mantas Stonkus
 Jonas Bačelis

Past VJs
 Ugnė Skonsmanaitė
 Artūras Mediuška
 Robertas Mediuška
 DJ Sezzy
 Orinta Servaitė
 Silvija Vilkaitė
 Tomas Sinickis
 Andrius Afanasjev
 Jurgis Didžiulis
 Artūras Burnickis

References

External links
 MTV Lithuania and Latvia homepage

MTV channels
Television channels in Lithuania
Television channels in Latvia
Music organizations based in Lithuania
2006 establishments in Lithuania
Music organisations based in Latvia
Television channel articles with incorrect naming style